An unauthorized biography is a biography written without the subject's permission or input. The term is usually restricted to biographies written within the subject's lifetime or shortly after their death; as such, it is not applied to biographies of historical figures written long after their deaths.

Other names 

Unauthorized biographies marked for revealing scandalous or embarrassing content are often called tell-alls, especially if they take the form of memoirs; tell-all biographies written by friends or family members of the subject are sometimes called kiss-and-tells. Due to the potential stigma associated with the phrase "unauthorized biography", unauthorized biographies written by journalists and intended to present a fairer portrait of the subject are sometimes called investigative biographies.

Objectivity 
Unauthorized biographies may be considered more objective but less reliable than other biographies, because they are not subject to the subject's (subjective) approval (and therefore may contain accurate information that the subject would not have authorized), but are also not privy to information or corrections known only to the subject or the subject's close friends and family.

Legality 
The subjects of unauthorized biographies are almost always public figures. Rarely do public figures succeed in preventing the release of unauthorized biographies. Unauthorized biographies of people who are not deemed public figures may be considered violations of the right to privacy and subject to legal action. As Ted Schwarz (1992) writes:

Speaking of U.S. courts, Lloyd Rich (2002) writes:

The legality of unauthorized biographies varies by country. Brazil enacted a short-lived law in 2014 requiring permission from biographies' subjects before publication.

Reception
Unauthorized biographies are not necessarily unwelcomed by their subjects, and in fact some unauthorized biographies have been criticized for displaying overeager admiration for them; however, unauthorized biographies have a wider reputation for fueling controversy and painting unflattering portraits of their subjects.

While unauthorized biographies often receive significant news coverage, their writers tend to face "media disdain" due to the perception that their work is gossipy, voyeuristic, and busybodyish.

For a period in the early 1990s, a number of independent publishers — including Revolutionary Comics and Personality Comics — found great success and sales of unauthorized comic book biographies. One publisher claimed that not all its biographies were unauthorized, stating that "DeForest Kelley... and Kim Basinger had sent autographed copies of their biographies, and... Walter Koenig... had edited his." A number of these companies later faced legal challenges to their publications,  however, which resulted in the unauthorized comics biographies fad dying down.

References

Citations

Bibliography

See also
Shock value
Doomscrolling
Non-fiction